I'm is the second extended play by South Korean singer Sejeong. It was released by Jellyfish Entertainment on March 29, 2021, and consists of five tracks including the title track "Warning".

Background and release
On March 9, 2021, Jellyfish Entertainment announced the Sejeong was preparing for a comeback. On March 17, the teaser video for her comeback was released. On March 19, Jelly Entertainment announced that EP I'm would be released on March 29, 2021. On March 21, the teaser audio for the title track "Warning" was released. A day later, the track listing was released.

Track listing

Personnel
Credits are adapted from Melon.

 Background vocals – Sejeong
 Bass – Choi Jun-young / Lee Woo-min ("collapsedone")
 Guitar – Lee Woo-min ("collapsedone") / Kim Myung-hwan / Noh Hee-chang
 Piano – Kim Ki-san / Kim Jin-sol
 Synthesizer – Lee Woo-min ("collapsedone")
 Midi programming – Lee Woo-min ("collapsedone") / Noh Hee-chang

 Digital editing – Lee Woo-min ("collapsedone") at JYP Studios / Heo Eun-suk / Noh Hee-chang
 Recording – Shin Bong-won at GLAB Studios / Lee Woo-min ("collapsedone") at JYP Studios / Tak Hyeong-wan at Jelly Sound / Oh Seong-geun at Studio T
 Mixing – Shin Bong-won at GLAB Studios / Koo Jong-pil at Klang Studio / Uncle Cho (assisted by Jeon Bu-yeon) at JoeLab / Jo Jun-seong at W Sound
 Engineer for mix – Jeong Yu-ra

Charts

Weekly charts

Monthly charts

Sales

Release history

References

Kim Se-jeong albums
2021 EPs
Jellyfish Entertainment EPs
Korean-language EPs